Saildrone, Inc. is a United States company based in Alameda, California, that designs, manufacturers, and operates a fleet of unmanned/uncrewed surface vehicles (USVs), or ocean drones, known as "saildrones". The company was founded by engineer Richard Jenkins in 2012.

Saildrone customers and research partners include the various departments of the National Oceanographic and Atmospheric Administration NASA, the University of New Hampshire, the University of Rhode Island, the Commonwealth Scientific and Industrial Research Organisation (Australia), the European Center for Medium-range Weather Forecasts, GEOMAR Helmholtz Centre for Ocean Research Kiel (Germany), the Monterey Bay Aquarium Research Institute, and others.

History
Saildrone was founded by Richard Jenkins in 2012.

In 2014, Saildrone began a partnership with the National Oceanic and Atmospheric Administration's Pacific Marine Environmental Laboratory under a Cooperative Research and Development Agreement to develop and refine vehicle capabilities and payload of sensors. Objectives included acoustic fisheries surveys for management and conservation while also collecting metocean data.

In 2016, Saildrone closed a $14 million Series A funding round. The round was led by Social Capital and included Capricorn Investment Group and Lux Capital. Saildrone had previously received mission-related investment from The Schmidt Family Foundation, a private foundation created by Eric and Wendy Schmidt.

In 2017, two saildrones deployed from San Francisco took part in the NASA-funded Salinity Processes in the Upper-ocean Regional Study 2 (SPURS-2) field campaign as part of their more than six-month Tropical Pacific Observing System (TPOS)-2020 pilot study in the eastern tropical Pacific. The mission compared saildrone measurements with those of the research vessel Revelle and the Woods Hole Oceanographic Institution (WHOI) SPURS-2 buoy. The data collected by the saildrones was found to be in good agreement with the ship and buoy, and demonstrated the saildrone to be “an effective platform for observing a wide range of oceanographic variables important to air-sea interaction studies,” according to a paper published in Oceanography.

In 2018, the website DroneBelow reported the company raised a $60 million Series B funding round to scale operations with participation from Horizons Ventures as well as existing investors Social Capital, Capricorn Investment Group, and Lux Capital.

In October 2020, the U.S. Coast Guard Research and Development Center in Hawaii began a 30-day test to "assess low-cost, commercially available autonomous solutions to improve maritime domain awareness in remote regions of the Pacific Ocean." Saildrone was one of two platforms tested.

In 2021, TechCrunch reported the company had raised a $100 million Series C funding round led by Mary Meeker's investment fund Bond Capital with participation from new investors XN, Standard Investments, Emerson Collective, Crowley Maritime Corporation, as well as previous investors Capricorn's Technology Impact Fund, Lux Capital, Social Capital, and Tribe Capital.

In 2022, the Saildrone Surveyor was recognized with the Innovation Award from the Blue Marine Foundation and BOAT International's annual Ocean Awards for revolutionizing ocean mapping. The company says that with 20 Saildrone Surveyors, it should be possible to achieve Seabed 2030's goal of mapping the world's oceans in high-resolution by the end of the decade.

Vehicles
There are three Saildrone platforms: Explorer, Voyager, and Surveyor. All three Saildrone uncrewed surface vehicles (USVs) combine wind-powered propulsion technology with solar-powered meteorological and oceanographic sensors.

Saildrone Explorer

The Explorer is designed for fisheries missions, metocean data collection, ecosystem monitoring, and satellite calibration and validation missions.

Saildrone Voyager

In August 2021, Seapower Magazine reported the company is adding a new mid-size USV to the fleet: The Voyager is a  USV with primary wind power and auxiliary propulsion of a 4kW electric motor for a wide variety of missions including bathymetry (ocean mapping) missions, border patrol and maritime domain awareness. The average speed is 5 knots.

Saildrone Surveyor
According to Wired, the Surveyor was first launched in January 2021 and is designed to carry multibeam echo sounders for IHO-compliant bathymetry surveys. It also carries an acoustic Doppler current profiler to measure the speed and direction of ocean currents.

In July 2021, the Surveyor completed its first trans-Pacific mapping mission sailing from San Francisco to Honolulu, Hawaii, and mapping  of seafloor along the way. Hawaii News Now reported that 20 Surveyors could map the entire ocean in less than 10 years.

In September 2022, it was announced that Austal USA signed an agreement with Saildrone, to build Saildrone Surveyor drones by year end for the US Navy, and other customers.

Missions

2019 Antarctic circumnavigation
In January 2019, a consortium of organizations led by the Li Ka Shing Foundation launched an autonomous circumnavigation of Antarctica using a group of saildrones. Researchers from agencies around the world participated including from NOAA, NASA, CSIRO, Palmer Long-Term Ecological Research, the Scripps Institution of Oceanography, the Southern Ocean Observing System, the Japan Agency for Marine-Earth Science and Technology, the Korea Polar Research Institute, the Norwegian Polar Institute, the University of Exeter, the University of Gothenburg, the University of Otago, and the New Zealand National Institute of Water and Atmospheric Research. Bloomberg Businessweek reported that, on August 3, 2019, SD 1020 became the first autonomous vehicle to circumnavigate Antarctica, having spent 196 days in the Southern Ocean sailing 13,670 miles. During the mission, SD 1020 had to survive freezing temperatures,  waves,  winds, and collisions with giant icebergs. In order to survive the extreme conditions of the Southern Ocean, the saildrone was equipped with a special "square" wing.

According to a paper published in Geophysical Research Letters by oceanographers Adrienne Sutton, Nancy Williams, and Bronte Tilbrook, one aspect of the mission focused on using Saildrone in situ data collection to better understand the role of the Southern Ocean in regulating the global carbon budget. Assumptions that the Southern Ocean is a significant carbon sink had previously been made using ship-based measurements, which are limited due to challenging ocean conditions in the Southern Ocean. The data collected by the saildrone was used to reduce uncertainty about Southern Ocean CO2 uptake: "By directly measuring air and surface seawater carbon dioxide (CO2) and wind speed on the USV, we were able to observe CO2 exchange between the ocean and atmosphere every hour during the mission. Using this data set, we estimated potential errors in these measurements as well as other approaches to estimating CO2 exchange."

2021 Atlantic hurricane mission
In partnership with NOAA, Saildrone deployed five vehicles equipped with "hurricane" wings to the tropical Atlantic Ocean to study air-sea heat exchange to better understand hurricane rapid intensification during the 2021 Atlantic hurricane season. On September 30, 2021, SD 1045 became the first Saildrone Explorer to sail into a category 4 hurricane. NOAA has stated that it will deploy five more Saildrone USVs during the 2022 hurricane season.

References

External links
 Official website

Unmanned surface vehicles of USA
Oceanographic instrumentation
Data_companies
Companies_based_in_Alameda,_California
Technology companies based in the San Francisco Bay Area